The Brenken Case (German: Der Fall Brenken) is a 1934 German comedy crime film directed by Carl Lamac and starring Walter Steinbeck, Hans Brausewetter and Rudolf Klein-Rogge. The film's sets were designed by the art directors Gustav A. Knauer and Alexander Mügge.

Synopsis
An attack on the industrialist owner of the Brenken factory draws newspaper headlines. It later transpires that he has organised it himself in order to try to deter rivals from buying his company's shares on the stock exchange.

Cast
 Walter Steinbeck as Generaldirektor Hermann Brenken, Industrieller 
 Hans Brausewetter as Hans Hall, Berichterstatter 
 Rudolf Klein-Rogge as Bert Benson, Artist 
 Genia Nikolaieva as Inge Brandt, Schauspielerin 
 Jessie Vihrog as Lotte Menzig, Telephonistin 
 Trude Hesterberg as Fräulein Bomst, Direktrice Gussersee-Hotel 
 Franz Weber as Alois Huber, Nachtportier Gussersee-Hotel 
 Hans Berghaus as Der Tagportier Gussersee-Hotel 
 Veit Harlan as Der Unbekannte 
 Adele Sandrock as Die Frau Generalin

References

Bibliography 
 Noack, Frank. Veit Harlan: The Life and Work of a Nazi Filmmaker. University Press of Kentucky, 2016.

External links 
 

1934 films
1930s crime comedy films
German crime comedy films
Films of Nazi Germany
1930s German-language films
Films directed by Karel Lamač
German black-and-white films
1934 comedy films
Films scored by Eduard Künneke
1930s German films